The 1916 United States presidential election in Ohio was held on November 7, 1916. State voters chose 24 electors to the Electoral College, who voted for president and vice president. 

Ohio was won by the Democratic Party candidate, incumbent President Woodrow Wilson, who won the state with 51.86 percent of the popular vote. The Republican Party candidate, Charles Evans Hughes, garnered 44.18 percent of the popular vote. 

As a result of his win in Ohio, Wilson became the first Democratic presidential candidate since Andrew Jackson in 1832 to win Ohio with a majority of the votes, although three Democrats in the intervening period – Wilson in 1912, Franklin Pierce in 1852, and Lewis Cass in 1848 – had won the state with pluralities.

, this is the last election in which Delaware County voted for a Democratic presidential candidate.

Results

Results by county

See also
 United States presidential elections in Ohio

References

Ohio
1916
1916 Ohio elections